Gentlemen is the fourth novel by Swedish author Klas Östergren, published in 1980.

It was translated into English by Tiina Nunnally in 2007. A film adaptation, Gentlemen, directed by Mikael Marcimain, was released in 2014.

Plot summary
The novel is set in the late 1970s Stockholm. The narrator, Klas Östergren, is a young writer who shares the name with the author of the novel. He picks up a commission to write a pastiche of Strindberg's The Red Room, updating its political satire to mark the centenary of its publication.

Soon after, Klas finds out that he has been burgled on nearly all of his belongings. In a local boxing club he meets the elegant and charismatic Henry Morgan, a boxer, pianist and an ebullient if unreliable raconteur. Henry persuades Klas to move into his apartment, where he lives with his mentally unstable brother Leo.

The second part of the novel tells the story of the Morgan brother's previous life. A picaresque story of Henry as, among other things, a smuggler of false passports to East Berlin, and Leo who finds out about a political scandal concerning Swedish sales of weapons to nazi-Germany during World War II.

In the third part of the novel, Henry and Leo both mysteriously disappear, and Klas finds himself living alone in the apartment. He burns up his unsuccessful attempt to write a pastiche of The Red Room and begin to write a new story, the story about the Morgan brothers.

References

External links

1980 Swedish novels
Novels by Klas Östergren
Swedish-language novels
Swedish novels adapted into films
Novels set in Stockholm
Albert Bonniers Förlag books